In model checking, a field of computer science, a region is a convex polytope in  for some dimension , and more precisely a zone, satisfying some minimality property. The regions partition .

Furthermore, when those vectors are considered as a tuple of clocks, both vectors have the same  set of possible futures. Intuitively, it means that any timed propositional temporal logic-formula, or timed automaton or signal automaton using only the constraints of  can not distinguish both vectors.

Taking a product of this region automaton and of a timed automaton  which accepts a language  creates a finite automaton or a Büchi automaton which accepts untimed . This technique is used for example by the software UPPAAL.

Definition 
Let  a set of clocks. For each  let . Intuitively, this number represents an upper bound on the values to which the clock  can be compared. The definition of a region over the clocks of  uses those numbers 's.  Three equivalent definitions are now given.

Given a clock assignment ,   denotes the region in which   belongs.

Equivalence of clocks assignment 
The first definition allow to easily test whether two assignments belong to the same region.

A region may be defined as an equivalence class for some equivalence relation.
  iff , for each  and  an integer, and ~ being one of the following relation =, < or ≤.

The first kind of constraints ensures that  and  satisfies the same constraints.

The second kind of constraints ensures that the future of two assignments satisfy  the  same constraints. Then, the constraint  is eventually satisfied by the future of  without clock reset, but not by the future of  without clock reset.

Explicit definition of a region 
While the previous definition allow to test whether two assignments belong to the same region, it does not allow to easily represents a region as a data structure. The third definition given below allow to give a canonical encoding of a region.

A region can be explicitly defined as a zone, using a set  of equations and inequations satisfying the following constraints:
 for each ,  contains either:
  for some integer 
  for some integer ,
 ,

This definition allow to encode a region as a data structure. It suffices, for each clock, to state to which interval it belongs and to recall the order of the fractional part of the  clocks which belong in an open interval of length 1.

Timed bisimulation 
Let us now give a third definition of regions. While this definition is more abstract, it is also the reason why regions are used in model checking. Intuitively, this definition states that two clock assignments belong to the same region if the differences between  them  are  such that no timed automaton can notice them.  Given any run  starting with a clock assignment , for any other assignment  in the same region, there is a run , going through the same locations, reading the same letters, where the only difference is that the time waited between two successive transition may be different, and thus the successive clock variations are different.

The formal definition is now given. More precisely, this bisimulation preserves letters and locations but not the exact clock assignments.

Operation on regions 
Some operations are now defined over regions: Resetting some of its clock, and letting time pass.

Resetting clocks 
 each constraints of  not containing the clock ,

Time-successor 
Two equivalent definitions are now given.

Definition 
A clock region  is a time-successor of another clock region  if for each assignment , there exists some positive real  such that .

Note that it does not mean that . For example, the region  defined by the set of constraint  has the time-successor  defined by the set of constraint . Indeed, for each , it suffices to take .  However, there exists no real  such that  or even such that ; indeed,  defines a triangle while  defines a segment.

Computable definition 
The second definition now given allow to explicitly compute the set of time-successor of a region, given by its set of constraints.

Given a region  defined as a set of constraints , let us define its set of time-successors. In order to do so, the following variables are required. Let  the set of clocks  such that  contains the constraint .

If  is empty,  is its own time successor. The least time-successor, if  is non-empty, contains:
 the constraints of 
 ,
 , and
If  is empty,  the least time-successor is defined by the following constraints:

Properties 
There are at most  regions, where  is the number of clocks.

Region automaton 
Given a timed automaton , its region automaton is a finite automaton or a Büchi automaton which accepts untimed . This region graph is defined first.

Region graph 
The region graph is a rooted directed graph which models the set of possible clock valuations during a run of a timed-autoamton. It is defined as follows:
 its nodes are regions,
 its root is the initial region , defined by the set of constraints ,

Region automaton 

Let  a timed automaton. Since two clocks assignment belonging to the same region satisfies the same guard, each region contains enough information to decide which transitions can be taken.

Formally, the region automaton is defined as follows:

It follows that . In particular,  accepts a timed-word if and only if  accepts a word.

References 

 
Polytopes
Polytope